Kutasi is a surname. Notable people with the surname include:

György Kutasi (1910–1977), Hungarian water polo player
Lajos Kutasi (1915–?), Hungarian field handball player
Róbert Kutasi (died 2012), former chairman of Rákospalotai EAC